Pulheimer SC is a German sports club from Pulheim. It has sections for association football, handball, baseball (Pulheim Gophers), hockey, inline hockey, volleyball, badminton, tennis, table tennis, budo, fencing, track and field, cycling, swimming, dancing, and chess.

In June 1924, SC Sparta Pulheim was founded as a football club. Numerous other sports were added over the years. On 9 September 1966 it merged with VfL Pulheim (founded 1957), creating the modern club.

Successful club members in individual sports include Gerald Ciolek (road cycling) and Helga Arendt (400 metres).

References

External links
 Official site 

Football clubs in Germany
Football clubs in North Rhine-Westphalia
Sport in North Rhine-Westphalia
Association football clubs established in 1924
Athletics clubs in Germany
1924 establishments in Germany
Multi-sport clubs in Germany